Lioconcha hieroglyphica is a species of saltwater clam, a marine bivalve mollusc in the family Veneridae, the venus clams.

Description 

The shell of Lioconcha hieroglyphica reaches a maximum length of about 42 mm. The shape of the shell is trigonal with a truncated posterior. The anterodorsal margin is acutely rounded. The linule is elongated and heart-shaped. It has tan to dark brown rod-like and angular markings, often with the appearance of cuneiform or hieroglyphs. The markings may be the result of a diffusion-mediated chemical cellular automaton, like Conus textile'''s. The shell is white on the inside.

It is sometimes confused with Lioconcha castrensis''.

Distribution 

This species is found in the waters around Hawaii, the Philippines, and the Marshall Islands.

References

Additional reading 

 Huber M. (2010) Compendium of bivalves. A full-color guide to 3,300 of the world's marine bivalves. A status on Bivalvia after 250 years of research. Hackenheim: ConchBooks. 901 pp., 1

Veneridae
Bivalves described in 1837